The Limes Alutanus was a fortified line consisting of a vallum, built in the North-South direction, on the eastern side of the Olt river (Latin Alutus) and seven Roman castra, as is remembered by Tabula Peutingeriana. Limes Alutanus was the eastern border of the Roman province of Dacia Superior.

The fortification was ordered by the Roman emperor Hadrian, in order to stop invasions and raids from the east.

The following seven castra positions were assumed by Romanian archeologist Vasile Pârvan, and later confirmed by archeological research. They are:
Pons Vetus (Câineni, Vâlcea)
Praetorium (Racovița, Vâlcea)
Arutela ("Poiana Bivolari" point, near Călimăneşti town)
Castra Traiana (Sânbotin, Vâlcea)
Buridava (Stolniceni, Vâlcea)
Pons Aluti (Ioneştii Govorei)
Rusidava (Drăgăşani)

Historian Adrian Bejan also adds these castra in his work, Dacia Felix:
Acidava (Enoşeşti)
Romula (Reşca)
Râul Vadului
Copăceni

On the Olt River, at least other three castra exists:
(Cincșor) (Cincșor, Brașov)
(Feldioara) (Feldioara, Brașov)
Caput Stenarum (Boiţa, Sibiu)

See also
Limes (Roman Empire)
Limes Porolissensis
Limes Transalutanus

Notes

Roman frontiers
Roman Dacia
History of Oltenia
History of Muntenia